The 1982 VFL season was the 86th season of the Victorian Football League (VFL), the highest level senior Australian rules football competition in Victoria. The season featured twelve clubs, ran from 20 March until 25 September, and comprised a 22-game home-and-away season followed by a finals series featuring the top five clubs.

The season saw the VFL establish its first permanent interstate presence, as the South Melbourne Football Club (which was known after June just as the Swans, being renamed Sydney the following year) played all of its home games on Sunday afternoons in Sydney, New South Wales.

The premiership was won by the Carlton Football Club for the 14th time and second time consecutively, after it defeated  by 18 points in the VFL grand final.

Notable events
 South Melbourne, affected by limited finances and loss of its inner-city support base ever since World War II, relocated to Sydney after experimental matches played by the VFL there since 1979. Early in the season, the team was still formally known as South Melbourne, although it marketed itself as 'Sydney Swans' in Sydney; on 2 June, the team formally became known as 'the Swans' for the remainder of the season, before formally becoming the 'Sydney Swans' in 1983.
 The VFL's new headquarters at 120 Jolimont Road, Jolimont was officially opened by the recently appointed Victorian Governor Sir Brian Murray at a special dinner on 17 March in the function room of the building. The dinner, which was attended by over 120 invited guests, also served as the launch of the VFL season.  
However, League officials were unable to get approval from the clubs to remove the stipulation that required a replacement game at VFL Park if a premiership game was to be played at The Gabba. , who had played in the previous season's historic first game at the Gabba for premiership points, had been approached about transferring their home game against  from Windy Hill to Waverley, but refused. Football fans in Brisbane would have to wait until 1991 for the next League game played at the Gabba for premiership points.
 Round 3 - the split Easter round - set a number of VFL records on and off the field; the total gate takings for the round was regarded as the highest on record at the time, officially reported as $486,652, paid by 213,199 people.
 From 4 May, patrons were banned from bringing alcoholic beverages into VFL matches, and were limited to purchasing at most two pre-opened cans at a time from vendors at the ground. 
 Owing to the extreme drought and consequent firm grounds, the 1982 season remains the highest-scoring on record. Among the records were:
 an average game score of 112 points; the next highest average score in a season was 106 points in 1979 and 1983
 St Kilda and Footscray became the only teams ever to concede 3,000 points in one season
 66 scores of 20 goals occurred, a record equalled only in 1991
 57 matches where both teams scored more than 100 points - no other season had more than fifty such matches
 Round 10 is the only round in VFL/AFL history in which every team scored 100 or more points. 
 In Round 16 against North Melbourne, Hawthorn set record scores of 13.3 (81) for the first quarter and 20.7 (127) for the first half. The former record stood until 2011, and the latter stood until 2004.
 After a negative response from the players since its introduction in 1980, the VFL abandoned the practice of presenting runners-up medals to the losing team as part of the grand final post-match presentation.
 In Round 18, Leigh Matthews ran into and broke a behind post at Windy Hill.
 Early in the season, the VFL arranged for the grand finalists to play a rematch as a demonstration sport at the 1982 Commonwealth Games, held in Brisbane shortly after the season was finished. Carlton and Richmond played the exhibition match at the Gabba on Wednesday, 6 October, and Richmond won the high-scoring match 28.16 (184) to 26.10 (166).

Night series

The Swans defeated  13.12 (90) to 8.10 (58) in the final.

Premiership season

Round 1

Round 2

Round 3

Round 4

Round 5

|- style="background:#ccf;"
| Home team
| Home team score
| Away team
| Away team score
| Venue
| Crowd
| Date
|- style="background:#fff;"
| 
| 13.22 (100)
| 
| 10.22 (82)
| Princes Park
| 20,110
| 24 April 1982
|- style="background:#fff;"
| 
| 12.12 (84)
| Swans
| 11.16 (82)
| Kardinia Park
| 20,770
| 24 April 1982
|- style="background:#fff;"
| 
| 15.20 (110)
| 
| 20.9 (129)
| Western Oval
| 18,526
| 24 April 1982
|- style="background:#fff;"
| 
| 18.19 (127)
| 
| 15.12 (102)
| Junction Oval
| 18,268
| 24 April 1982
|- style="background:#fff;"
| 
| 19.22 (136)
| 
| 18.11 (119)
| Arden Street Oval
| 23,405
| 24 April 1982
|- style="background:#fff;"
| 
| 9.12 (66)
| 
| 9.22 (76)
| VFL Park
| 26,950
| 24 April 1982

Round 6

|- style="background:#ccf;"
| Home team
| Home team score
| Away team
| Away team score
| Venue
| Crowd
| Date
|- style="background:#fff;"
| 
| 13.10 (88)
| 
| 12.19 (91)
| Victoria Park
| 27,052
| 1 May 1982
|- style="background:#fff;"
| 
| 18.8 (116)
| 
| 15.16 (106)
| MCG
| 31,438
| 1 May 1982
|- style="background:#fff;"
| 
| 17.20 (122)
| 
| 7.22 (64)
| Kardinia Park
| 18,791
| 1 May 1982
|- style="background:#fff;"
| 
| 11.14 (80)
| 
| 16.22 (118)
| Moorabbin Oval
| 26,185
| 1 May 1982
|- style="background:#fff;"
| 
| 15.11 (101)
| 
| 19.21 (135)
| VFL Park
| 34,921
| 1 May 1982
|- style="background:#fff;"
| Swans
| 15.21 (111)
| 
| 18.9 (117)
| SCG
| 15,461
| 2 May 1982

Round 7

|- style="background:#ccf;"
| Home team
| Home team score
| Away team
| Away team score
| Venue
| Crowd
| Date
|- style="background:#fff;"
| 
| 22.11 (143)
| 
| 28.12 (180)
| MCG
| 25,704
| 8 May 1982
|- style="background:#fff;"
| 
| 15.20 (110)
| Swans
| 20.11 (131)
| Western Oval
| 11,487
| 8 May 1982
|- style="background:#fff;"
| 
| 19.15 (129)
| 
| 17.15 (117)
| Junction Oval
| 14,675
| 8 May 1982
|- style="background:#fff;"
| 
| 15.20 (110)
| 
| 7.7 (49)
| Princes Park
| 28,736
| 8 May 1982
|- style="background:#fff;"
| 
| 17.20 (122)
| 
| 9.13 (67)
| Windy Hill
| 25,510
| 8 May 1982
|- style="background:#fff;"
| 
| 17.12 (114)
| 
| 21.14 (140)
| VFL Park
| 33,222
| 8 May 1982

Round 8

|- style="background:#ccf;"
| Home team
| Home team score
| Away team
| Away team score
| Venue
| Crowd
| Date
|- style="background:#fff;"
| 
| 23.18 (156)
| 
| 6.16 (52)
| Arden Street Oval
| 16,258
| 15 May 1982
|- style="background:#fff;"
| 
| 12.15 (87)
| 
| 11.23 (89)
| Kardinia Park
| 28,403
| 15 May 1982
|- style="background:#fff;"
| 
| 15.15 (105)
| 
| 16.15 (111)
| Princes Park
| 26,865
| 15 May 1982
|- style="background:#fff;"
| 
| 11.11 (77)
| 
| 14.22 (106)
| Western Oval
| 17,903
| 15 May 1982
|- style="background:#fff;"
| 
| 13.21 (99)
| 
| 25.14 (164)
| VFL Park
| 25,856
| 15 May 1982
|- style="background:#fff;"
| Swans
| 15.25 (115)
| 
| 13.19 (97)
| SCG
| 20,905
| 16 May 1982

Round 9

|- style="background:#ccf;"
| Home team
| Home team score
| Away team
| Away team score
| Venue
| Crowd
| Date
|- style="background:#fff;"
| 
| 19.19 (133)
| 
| 12.13 (85)
| Windy Hill
| 22,403
| 22 May 1982
|- style="background:#fff;"
| 
| 13.14 (92)
| 
| 17.12 (114)
| Victoria Park
| 24,904
| 22 May 1982
|- style="background:#fff;"
| 
| 27.23 (185)
| Swans
| 12.11 (83)
| Princes Park
| 23,954
| 22 May 1982
|- style="background:#fff;"
| 
| 21.13 (139)
| 
| 14.14 (98)
| MCG
| 22,493
| 22 May 1982
|- style="background:#fff;"
| 
| 16.19 (115)
| 
| 25.12 (162)
| Moorabbin Oval
| 15,140
| 22 May 1982
|- style="background:#fff;"
| 
| 15.19 (109)
| 
| 9.9 (63)
| VFL Park
| 25,237
| 22 May 1982

Round 10

Round 11

|- style="background:#ccf;"
| Home team
| Home team score
| Away team
| Away team score
| Venue
| Crowd
| Date
|- style="background:#fff;"
| 
| 20.14 (134)
| Swans
| 18.25 (133)
| MCG
| 28,216
| 5 June 1982
|- style="background:#fff;"
| 
| 26.22 (178)
| 
| 14.15 (99)
| Princes Park
| 14,087
| 5 June 1982
|- style="background:#fff;"
| 
| 26.16 (172)
| 
| 21.10 (136)
| Victoria Park
| 26,657
| 5 June 1982
|- style="background:#fff;"
| 
| 10.11 (71)
| 
| 17.9 (111)
| Kardinia Park
| 29,884
| 5 June 1982
|- style="background:#fff;"
| 
| 13.18 (96)
| 
| 15.15 (105)
| Arden Street Oval
| 26,206
| 5 June 1982
|- style="background:#fff;"
| 
| 16.12 (108)
| 
| 23.22 (160)
| VFL Park
| 13,908
| 5 June 1982

Round 12

|- style="background:#ccf;"
| Home team
| Home team score
| Away team
| Away team score
| Venue
| Crowd
| Date
|- style="background:#fff;"
| 
| 23.18 (156)
| 
| 17.16 (118)
| MCG
| 43,474
| 12 June 1982
|- style="background:#fff;"
| 
| 14.11 (95)
| 
| 19.24 (138)
| Moorabbin Oval
| 19,385
| 12 June 1982
|- style="background:#fff;"
| Swans
| 15.15 (105)
| 
| 16.15 (111)
| SCG
| 14,523
| 13 June 1982
|- style="background:#fff;"
| 
| 6.17 (53)
| 
| 17.10 (112)
| VFL Park
| 38,086
| 14 June 1982
|- style="background:#fff;"
| 
| 24.19 (163)
| 
| 14.13 (97)
| Victoria Park
| 29,075
| 14 June 1982
|- style="background:#fff;"
| 
| 19.12 (126)
| 
| 8.18 (66)
| Windy Hill
| 33,800
| 14 June 1982

Round 13

|- style="background:#ccf;"
| Home team
| Home team score
| Away team
| Away team score
| Venue
| Crowd
| Date
|- style="background:#fff;"
| 
| 16.11 (107)
| 
| 12.20 (92)
| Western Oval
| 10,530
| 19 June 1982
|- style="background:#fff;"
| 
| 12.26 (98)
| 
| 9.17 (71)
| Princes Park
| 30,346
| 19 June 1982
|- style="background:#fff;"
| 
| 21.8 (134)
| 
| 10.10 (70)
| MCG
| 23,365
| 19 June 1982
|- style="background:#fff;"
| 
| 13.10 (88)
| 
| 11.21 (87)
| Arden Street Oval
| 16,000
| 19 June 1982
|- style="background:#fff;"
| 
| 10.5 (65)
| 
| 12.10 (82)
| VFL Park
| 64,319
| 19 June 1982
|- style="background:#fff;"
| Swans
| 30.19 (199)
| 
| 15.13 (103)
| SCG
| 10,034
| 20 June 1982

Round 14

|- style="background:#ccf;"
| Home team
| Home team score
| Away team
| Away team score
| Venue
| Crowd
| Date
|- style="background:#fff;"
| 
| 17.8 (110)
| 
| 10.3 (63)
| Kardinia Park
| 15,107
| 26 June 1982
|- style="background:#fff;"
| 
| 16.16 (112)
| Swans
| 20.13 (133)
| Junction Oval
| 12,300
| 26 June 1982
|- style="background:#fff;"
| 
| 10.12 (72)
| 
| 13.16 (94)
| Victoria Park
| 25,409
| 26 June 1982
|- style="background:#fff;"
| 
| 17.14 (116)
| 
| 12.10 (82)
| Princes Park
| 23,354
| 26 June 1982
|- style="background:#fff;"
| 
| 14.8 (92)
| 
| 13.16 (94)
| VFL Park
| 18,947
| 26 June 1982
|- style="background:#fff;"
| 
| 14.13 (97)
| 
| 15.15 (105)
| MCG
| 47,656
| 26 June 1982

Round 15

|- style="background:#ccf;"
| Home team
| Home team score
| Away team
| Away team score
| Venue
| Crowd
| Date
|- style="background:#fff;"
| 
| 21.13 (139)
| 
| 7.12 (54)
| Windy Hill
| 20,059
| 3 July 1982
|- style="background:#fff;"
| 
| 18.20 (128)
| 
| 16.15 (111)
| Princes Park
| 21,871
| 3 July 1982
|- style="background:#fff;"
| 
| 17.14 (116)
| 
| 22.14 (146)
| MCG
| 48,338
| 3 July 1982
|- style="background:#fff;"
| 
| 20.11 (131)
| 
| 18.12 (120)
| Moorabbin Oval
| 15,958
| 3 July 1982
|- style="background:#fff;"
| 
| 13.11 (89)
| 
| 16.13 (109)
| VFL Park
| 32,812
| 3 July 1982
|- style="background:#fff;"
| Swans
| 18.18 (126)
| 
| 12.15 (87)
| SCG
| 12,221
| 4 July 1982

Round 16

|- style="background:#ccf;"
| Home team
| Home team score
| Away team
| Away team score
| Venue
| Crowd
| Date
|- style="background:#fff;"
| 
| 32.14 (206)
| 
| 15.22 (112)
| Princes Park
| 18,760
| 10 July 1982
|- style="background:#fff;"
| 
| 25.7 (157)
| 
| 17.13 (115)
| Western Oval
| 14,004
| 10 July 1982
|- style="background:#fff;"
| 
| 21.13 (139)
| 
| 9.9 (63)
| VFL Park
| 27,829
| 10 July 1982
|- style="background:#fff;"
| 
| 9.18 (72)
| 
| 23.9 (147)
| MCG
| 36,161
| 17 July 1982
|- style="background:#fff;"
| 
| 12.10 (82)
| Swans
| 17.13 (115)
| Windy Hill
| 22,278
| 17 July 1982
|- style="background:#fff;"
| 
| 10.24 (84)
| 
| 9.10 (64)
| VFL Park
| 26,105
| 17 July 1982

Round 17

|- style="background:#ccf;"
| Home team
| Home team score
| Away team
| Away team score
| Venue
| Crowd
| Date
|- style="background:#fff;"
| 
| 28.17 (185)
| 
| 14.18 (102)
| MCG
| 22,749
| 24 July 1982
|- style="background:#fff;"
| 
| 15.18 (108)
| 
| 17.17 (119)
| Victoria Park
| 24,487
| 24 July 1982
|- style="background:#fff;"
| 
| 22.14 (146)
| 
| 16.17 (113)
| Arden Street Oval
| 10,887
| 24 July 1982
|- style="background:#fff;"
| 
| 16.19 (115)
| 
| 11.9 (75)
| Kardinia Park
| 19,892
| 24 July 1982
|- style="background:#fff;"
| 
| 18.15 (123)
| 
| 27.8 (170)
| VFL Park
| 24,760
| 24 July 1982
|- style="background:#fff;"
| Swans
| 14.27 (111)
| 
| 15.8 (98)
| SCG
| 11,289
| 25 July 1982

Round 18

|- style="background:#ccf;"
| Home team
| Home team score
| Away team
| Away team score
| Venue
| Crowd
| Date
|- style="background:#fff;"
| 
| 12.10 (82)
| 
| 15.10 (100)
| Windy Hill
| 22,991
| 31 July 1982
|- style="background:#fff;"
| 
| 12.13 (85)
| Swans
| 13.12 (90)
| Victoria Park
| 20,636
| 31 July 1982
|- style="background:#fff;"
| 
| 30.21 (201)
| 
| 10.12 (72)
| Princes Park
| 17,514
| 31 July 1982
|- style="background:#fff;"
| 
| 14.12 (96)
| 
| 22.18 (150)
| Moorabbin Oval
| 10,955
| 31 July 1982
|- style="background:#fff;"
| 
| 13.15 (93)
| 
| 24.19 (163)
| MCG
| 18,649
| 31 July 1982
|- style="background:#fff;"
| 
| 24.19 (163)
| 
| 11.13 (79)
| VFL Park
| 23,237
| 31 July 1982

Round 19

|- style="background:#ccf;"
| Home team
| Home team score
| Away team
| Away team score
| Venue
| Crowd
| Date
|- style="background:#fff;"
| 
| 7.8 (50)
| 
| 16.16 (112)
| Western Oval
| 16,259
| 7 August 1982
|- style="background:#fff;"
| 
| 21.16 (142)
| 
| 11.12 (78)
| Junction Oval
| 9,987
| 7 August 1982
|- style="background:#fff;"
| 
| 22.18 (150)
| 
| 11.16 (82)
| Arden Street Oval
| 11,634
| 7 August 1982
|- style="background:#fff;"
| 
| 20.20 (140)
| 
| 16.22 (118)
| Princes Park
| 18,699
| 7 August 1982
|- style="background:#fff;"
| 
| 14.17 (101)
| 
| 20.17 (137)
| VFL Park
| 28,379
| 7 August 1982
|- style="background:#fff;"
| Swans
| 15.16 (106)
| 
| 9.18 (72)
| SCG
| 25,601
| 8 August 1982

Round 20

|- style="background:#ccf;"
| Home team
| Home team score
| Away team
| Away team score
| Venue
| Crowd
| Date
|- style="background:#fff;"
| 
| 18.18 (126)
| Swans
| 8.14 (62)
| Princes Park
| 15,743
| 14 August 1982
|- style="background:#fff;"
| 
| 17.12 (114)
| 
| 25.18 (168)
| Victoria Park
| 20,702
| 14 August 1982
|- style="background:#fff;"
| 
| 5.18 (48)
| 
| 15.15 (105)
| Kardinia Park
| 14,597
| 14 August 1982
|- style="background:#fff;"
| 
| 10.16 (76)
| 
| 13.12 (90)
| Moorabbin Oval
| 15,705
| 14 August 1982
|- style="background:#fff;"
| 
| 9.10 (64)
| 
| 13.14 (92)
| MCG
| 71,203
| 14 August 1982
|- style="background:#fff;"
| 
| 17.16 (118)
| 
| 16.8 (104)
| VFL Park
| 11,133
| 14 August 1982

Round 21

|- style="background:#ccf;"
| Home team
| Home team score
| Away team
| Away team score
| Venue
| Crowd
| Date
|- style="background:#fff;"
| 
| 19.17 (131)
| 
| 12.11 (83)
| Junction Oval
| 8,280
| 21 August 1982
|- style="background:#fff;"
| 
| 14.12 (96)
| 
| 12.13 (85)
| Windy Hill
| 17,587
| 21 August 1982
|- style="background:#fff;"
| 
| 26.24 (180)
| 
| 17.8 (110)
| Princes Park
| 28,309
| 21 August 1982
|- style="background:#fff;"
| 
| 14.8 (92)
| 
| 14.19 (103)
| MCG
| 26,049
| 21 August 1982
|- style="background:#fff;"
| 
| 22.16 (148)
| 
| 16.16 (112)
| VFL Park
| 25,816
| 21 August 1982
|- style="background:#fff;"
| Swans
| 16.14 (110)
| 
| 19.13 (127)
| SCG
| 21,083
| 22 August 1982

Round 22

|- style="background:#ccf;"
| Home team
| Home team score
| Away team
| Away team score
| Venue
| Crowd
| Date
|- style="background:#fff;"
| 
| 11.13 (79)
| 
| 15.8 (98)
| Arden Street Oval
| 19,135
| 28 August 1982
|- style="background:#fff;"
| 
| 25.13 (163)
| Swans
| 22.16 (148)
| MCG
| 27,521
| 28 August 1982
|- style="background:#fff;"
| 
| 23.23 (161)
| 
| 11.7 (73)
| Princes Park
| 13,116
| 28 August 1982
|- style="background:#fff;"
| 
| 9.8 (62)
| 
| 32.16 (208)
| Western Oval
| 21,575
| 28 August 1982
|- style="background:#fff;"
| 
| 18.13 (121)
| 
| 18.18 (126)
| Kardinia Park
| 20,950
| 28 August 1982
|- style="background:#fff;"
| 
| 17.9 (111)
| 
| 23.12 (150)
| VFL Park
| 46,130
| 28 August 1982

Ladder

Finals series

Week one

Week two

Week three

Week four

See also
 McIntyre "final five" system

Notes
 The inaugural VFL Players Association Most Valuable Player Award was won by Leigh Matthews. In 2002, the award was renamed the Leigh Matthews Trophy in his honour.
Geelong 19.18 (132) defeated  12.11 (83) in the grand final, held as a curtain-raiser to the seniors Grand Final on 25 September.

References

Bibliography
 Stephen Rogers and Ashley Brown (1998). Every Game Ever Played. 6th ed. Victoria: Penguin Books.

External links

Australian Football League seasons
VFL season